Saints Philo and Agathopodes were two deacons who assisted Ignatius. After his martyrdom, it was they who brought back his relics to Antioch.

References

2nd-century Christian saints
Deacons
150 deaths
Year of birth unknown